Zero Chill is a British teen drama streaming television series, created by Kirstie Falkous and John Regier for Netflix, and produced by Lime Pictures, with Adam Usden serving as lead writer. The show was filmed in Sheffield, England. Grace Beedie and Dakota Benjamin Taylor star in the series alongside an ensemble cast, portraying the MacBentley twins, who are a figure skater and ice hockey player respectively. The series premiered on 15 March 2021. On 17 November 2021, Netflix cancelled Zero Chill after one season.

Premise
The MacBentley family moves to England from Canada, when Mac is offered a place on a prestigious ice hockey team. His twin sister, Kayla, struggles to adapt to the change, having been separated from her figure skating partner.

Cast and characters

Main
 Grace Beedie as Kayla MacBentley, a figure skater who is forced to move to England when her twin brother, Mac, is offered a place on the Hammers
 Dakota Benjamin Taylor as "Mac" MacBentley, a talented but arrogant hockey player for the Hammers
 Jeremias Amoore as Bear Stelzer, captain of the Hammers and Sam's older brother
 Anastasia Chocholatá as Ava Hammarström, a figure skater who wants to tryout for her father's hockey team
 Leonardo Fontes as Sam Stelzer, goalie for the Hammers and Bear's naive younger brother
 Jade Ma as Sky Tyler, an ice skater who stopped due to having leukaemia. She is Kayla's best friend and Mac's love interest.
 Sarah-Jane Potts as Jenny MacBentley, the mother of Kayla and Mac
 Doug Rao as Luke MacBentley, the father of Kayla and Mac, and assistant coach for the Hammers
 Tanja Ribič as Elina Hammarström, the harsh and overbearing mother of Ava, and Anton's ex-wife
 Oscar Skagerberg as Anton Hammarström, Ava's father, coach of the Hammers and Elina's ex-husband
 Stan Steinbichler as Nico Haas, one of Mac's teammates who takes a dislike to him
 Christina Tam as Holly Tyler, the overprotective mother of Sky who is reluctant to let her daughter skate again due to Sky's health

Recurring
 Toby Murray as Archie Long, a figure skater who cannot find a partner
 Kenneth Tynan as Jacob Schimmer, Kayla's former skating partner from Toronto
 Ayumi Roux as Maia Legarde, Jacob's new partner
 Brett Houghton as Carson Hubick, a player from the Orcas and Mac's rival
 Jerry Kwarteng as Axel Stelzer, the father of Bear and Sam
 Calin Bleau as Marek Zelezney, coach of the Wolverines

Production
Producers of Zero Chill wanted to cast real skaters for the series, since it brought "authenticity" that "CGI trickery" could not. Regardless of their skating experience, the cast members were sent to a nine-week training programme prior to filming. Executive producer Angelo Abela stated that the cast members got to try out both sports, so ice skaters could play ice hockey and vice versa. Dakota Benjamin Taylor explained that for the ice skating scenes, cast members were not permitted to do jumps on the ice. After producers met with Team GB figure skating coach David Hartley, the general manager of the IceSheffield, where Hartley works, offered them the opportunity to film the series there. When the cast members went in for training, they were able to watch professional figure skaters training, as well as the Sheffield Steelers.

Abela stated that they used filming techniques that were used on Free Rein, another series produced by Lime Pictures. He explained: "We decided to shoot in two different ways: with the figure skaters we went for very elegant, long tracking shots on the ice. We put cameramen in rickshaws and had them pushed on the ice alongside the skaters. Then, with the hockey scenes, it became much more handheld camera work, filmed behind Perspex screens on the ice." On the choice to film the series in Sheffield, Abala explained that the city is known as a "major ice-skating hub". Other filming locations include Park Hill, Broomhall, Sheaf Valley Park, the Cholera Monument Grounds and Norfolk Heritage Park. Hartley and two members of the Sheffield Steelers were also hired as coaches for the cast members. In November 2021, it was announced by Deadline Hollywood that Netflix had cancelled Zero Chill after one series.

Episodes

References

External links
 
 

2021 British television series debuts
2021 British television series endings
2020s British drama television series
2020s British sports television series
2020s British teen television series
2020s teen drama television series
British teen drama television series
English-language Netflix original programming
Figure skating on television
Ice hockey television series
Television series about families
Television series about teenagers
Television series about twins
Television series by All3Media
Television shows filmed in England
Television shows set in England
Youth culture in the United Kingdom